The Leyden papyrus X (P. Leyden X) is a papyrus codex written in Greek at about the end of the 3rd century A.D. or perhaps around 250 A.D. and buried with its owner, and today preserved at Leiden University in the Netherlands.

Origin 

The Leiden papyrus was discovered at Thebes in Egypt, together with the Stockholm Papyrus, which was probably written by the same scribe, and many Greek magical papyri, in the early 19th century by an adventurer calling himself Jean d'Anastasi, holding the office of Swedish vice-consul in Alexandria.  In 1828 he sold a number of papyri to the Dutch government, which were lodged at the Leiden University Library, and labelled alphabetically from A to Z.

The papyri were first published and translated into Latin by Conrad Leemans in 1885 (Papyri graeci musei antiquarii publici Lugduni Batavi). Papyri A to U relate to matters concerning Ancient Egyptian law. Papyri V, W and X deal with alchemy.

The related Stockholm papyrus was found together with these, and Anastasy donated it to Sweden in 1832. It was first published by Otto Lagercrantz in 1913 (Papyrus Graecus Holmiensis). Whereas the Leiden papyrus X deals with metallurgy, the Stockholm papyrus deals with gems, pearls and textile dyeing.

Papyrus V 
Papyrus V contains a recipe for a mystical ink made of misy (oxidized pyrite ores, a mix of copper and iron sulfates), green vitriol, oak apple, gum, and of a substance composed of 7 perfumes and 7 flowers. It has a recipe for purifying gold with cement royal. It gives a list of 37 secret names of plants, invented by holy scribes, containing code names such as "snake's blood" , "rat's tail", and "lion's semen". Traces of this nomenclature survive in botanical names, like in German "Löwenzahn" (dandelion: lion's tooth) and wolf's milk; also in dragon's blood, which probably still denotes the same resin as in ancient times. Some of these aliases are given by Dioscorides, but with different meanings.

Papyrus W 
Papyrus W contains magical invocations and Judaeo-Gnostic content. The 7 perfumes are given as: styrax dedicated to Saturn, malabathrum to Jupiter, costus to Mars, frankincense to the Sun, nard to Venus, cassia to Hermes, myrrh to the Moon. The 7 flowers are: nard, marjoram, lily, lotus, buttercup, narcissus, white violet.

Papyrus X 
The papyrus consists of 10 leaves, 30 x 34 cm in size, folded lengthwise and making 20 pages, of which 16 contain writing.  Each page has 28-47 lines.  The text contains one hundred and eleven recipes for extracting precious metals, or counterfeiting such metals, or precious stones and purple dye.  It also contains details of the manufacture of textiles, and making gold and silver inks.  The recipes are not detailed, and probably served as a memory aid for those already familiar with the process.  The presentation is exclusively practical, and does not include the usual alchemical or philosophical elements.  The last eleven recipes are simply short extracts from the Materia Medica of Pedanius Dioscorides. They are chiefly descriptions of certain minerals.

The Leiden papyrus X quotes Dioscorides without spurious additions that may have been introduced by later scribes. For example, Kurt Sprengel's edition of De materia medica writes that mercury is stored in glass, leaden, tin and silver vessels. While it is true that glass is unaffected by mercury, all the metals named are attacked, and Zosimus takes special care in pointing that out. The Dioscorides extract in the Leiden papyrus X recommends only glass for storing mercury.

References

Bibliography 
 Robert Halleux: Papyrus de Leyden, papyrus de Stockholm, fragments de recettes. Texte établi et traduction. Les Belles Lettres, Paris 1981 (= Les alchimistes grecs, 1), .
 Conrad Leemans: Papyri graeci Musei antiquarii publici Lugduni-Batavi, vol. 2, Leiden 1885, p. 199 f.
 Earle Radcliffe Caley: The Leyden papyrus X: an English translation with brief notes. In: Journal of Chemical Education Vol. 3, No. 10 (October 1926), p. 1149-1166.
 Leslie Bernard Hunt: The Oldest Metallurgical Handbook: Recipes of a Fourth Century Goldsmith. In: Gold Bulletin 9 (1976), S. 24-31
 C. Raub: How to coat objects with gold - Pliny, Leyden Papyrus X, Mappae Clavicula and Theophilus seen with a modern chemist's eyes. In: Christiane Eluère (Hrsg.), Outils et ateliers d'orfèvres des temps ancien, Société des Amis du Musée des Antiquités Nationales et du Château de Saint-Germain-en-Laye, Saint-Germain-en-Laye 1993 (= Antiquités nationales mémoire, 2), S. 101-110
 Arie Wallert: Alchemy and medieval art technology. In: Zweder R. von Martels (Hrsg.), Alchemy Revisited: Proceedings of the International Conference on the History of Alchemy at the University of Groningen 17–19 April 1989, Brill, Leiden [u.a.] 1990 (=  Collection de travaux de l'Académie Internationale d'Histoire des Sciences, 33), S. 154-161

External links 
 William B.Jensen,  The Leyden and Stockholm Papyri

Alchemical documents
Art technological sources
Egyptian papyri
Greek alchemy